The men's 100 metre butterfly competition of the swimming events at the 2011 Pan American Games took place on 20 October at the Scotiabank Aquatics Center.  The defending Pan American Games champion was Kaio de Almeida of Brazil.

This race consisted of two lengths of the pool, all in butterfly.

Records
Prior to this competition, the existing world and Pan American Games records were as follows:

Qualification
Each National Olympic Committee (NOC) was able to enter up to two entrants providing they had met the A standard (54.6) in the qualifying period (January 1, 2010 to September 4, 2011). NOCs were also permitted to enter one athlete providing they had met the B standard (56.2) in the same qualifying period.

Results
All times are in minutes and seconds.

Heats
The first round was held on October 20.

B Final 
The B final was also held on October 20.

A Final 
The A final was held on October 20.

References

Swimming at the 2011 Pan American Games
Men's 100 metre butterfly